Dragonlord is an American symphonic black metal band that was formed in 2001 as a side project by Eric Peterson and Steve Di Giorgio of Testament, and Steve Smyth of Nevermore. The band is a result of Eric Peterson's interest in darker music, and not being able to do that with Testament he formed Dragonlord. The band combines elements of black metal (screeching vocals, keyboards) with some thrash guitar influences. Lyrical themes vary, either about the rage of a dragon (hence the name), death, war, lost love, Satanic or otherwise anti-religious themes (common in black metal), or combinations.

DiGiorgio left the group shortly after its creation and was replaced by former Testament bassist Derrick Ramirez. Smyth left the project in 2005. Former Psypheria member Lyle Livingston plays keyboards for the band, and Jon Allen is their drummer. Vocalist Leah McHenry joined in 2018.

They have released three albums, Rapture in 2001, Black Wings of Destiny in 2005, and Dominion in 2018.

Band history 
In 2009, Eric Peterson released the following statement via Kerrang magazine:

In 2010, Eric Peterson issued another statement via Terrorizer magazine:

On March 7, 2012, Dragonlord was signed to Spinefarm/Universal Records.

As of October 2013, according to Eric Peterson, Dragonlord is recording a new album, "Dominion", which is set to release in early 2017. In April 2015, it was announced "Dominion" is currently in the mixing stage.

The album "Dominion" was released September 21, 2018, and featured the renowned bass guitarist from Slovenia, Tilen Hudrap (U.D.O, Pestilence, Paradox) as a guest on the J.R.R Tolkien inspired  track "The Discord of Melkor".

Members

Current members 
 Eric Peterson – vocals, guitars, bass
 Lyle Livingston – keyboards
 Alex Bent – drums
 Leah McHenry – female vocals and choirs

Former members 
 Steve Di Giorgio – bass (2000–2001)
 Steve Smyth – guitars (2000–2005)
 Derrick Ramirez – bass
 Mark Black – guitars
 Jon Allen – drums
 Claudeous Creamer – guitars
 Steve Schmidt – bass
 Gian Pyres – touring guitarist (2005–2006)

Discography 
 Rapture (2001)
 Black Wings of Destiny (2005)
 Dominion (2018)

References

External links 
Official Dragonlord website
Dragonlord at Encyclopaedia Metallum

American black metal musical groups
Musical groups established in 2001
Symphonic black metal musical groups
Musical quintets